Clinton Davis (born August 17, 1965) is a former American track athlete. He was an outstanding sprinter while at Steel Valley High School.

Davis was recruited by UCLA, but after an exceptional high school career chose to turn pro early.  He was Track and Field News "High School Athlete of the Year" in 1983.

References

External links

1965 births
Living people
Sportspeople from Pittsburgh
American male sprinters